Matamoros–Brownsville, also known as Brownsville–Matamoros, or simply as the Borderplex, is one of the six transborder agglomerations along the Mexico–United States border. The city of Matamoros is situated in the Mexican state of Tamaulipas, on the south bank of the Rio Grande, while the city of Brownsville is located in the U.S. state of Texas, directly north across the bank of the Rio Grande. The Matamoros–Brownsville area is connected by four international bridges. In addition, this transnational conurbation area has a population of 1,136,995, making it the fourth-largest metropolitan area on the Mexico-U.S. border.

The area of Matamoros–Brownsville lies among the top-10 fastest-growing urban areas in the United States. The Brownsville–Harlingen and the Brownsville–Harlingen–Raymondville metropolitan areas are included in the official countdown of this transnational conurbation.

Municipalities/counties
 Matamoros Municipality, Tamaulipas
 Cameron County, Texas
 Willacy County, Texas

Communities
Note: Principal cities are bolded.

Cities in Mexico
 Matamoros, Tamaulipas

Populated places
Note: Within the municipality of Matamoros. 
 Control
 Estación Ramírez
 Buena Vista
 Las Rusias
 Santa Adelaida
 La Gloria
 Sandoval
 México Agrario
 20 de Noviembre
 Ignacio Zaragoza
 Unión

Villages
 Over 468 municipal villages.

Cities in the United States
Brownsville 
Harlingen 
La Feria
Los Fresnos
Lyford
Palm Valley
Port Isabel
Raymondville
Rio Hondo
San Benito
San Perlita

Towns
Bayview
Combes
Indian Lake
Laguna Vista
Los Indios
Primera
Rancho Viejo
Santa Rosa
South Padre Island

Villages
Rangerville

Census-designated places

See also
San Diego–Tijuana
El Paso–Juárez
Reynosa–McAllen Metropolitan Area
Laredo–Nuevo Laredo
Metropolitan area of Tampico
Transnational conurbations Mexico/USA

References 

Metropolitan areas of Mexico
Metropolitan areas of Texas
Transborder agglomerations
Brownsville, Texas
Matamoros, Tamaulipas
Populated places in Cameron County, Texas
Populated places in Tamaulipas
Lower Rio Grande Valley
Tamaulipas populated places on the Rio Grande